Joe Ulrich is a retired U.S. soccer defender.  He won the 1982 Hermann Trophy as that year's top collegiate soccer player.  He also played three seasons in the Major Indoor Soccer League.

Youth and college
Ulrich attended Arlington High School.  After graduating from high school, Ulrich played soccer at Ulster County Community College in New York for two years. In December 1980, he was selected by the Tampa Bay Rowdies in the first round of the North American Soccer League draft. Instead of signing with the Rowdies he continued his education and transferred to Duke University in 1981.  While at Duke University, he played on the school’s men's soccer team in 1981 and 1982.  In 1981, he was named the ACC Player of the Year.  In 1982, the Blue Devils went to the NCAA Championship game where it lost to Indiana in eight overtimes.  That year, Ulrich won the Hermann Trophy as the top collegiate player of the year.  In his two years at Duke, he scored 13 goals, despite playing as a defender.  In 1999, Duke inducted Ulrich into its Athletic Hall of Fame.

Professional
In December 1982, the Chicago Sting drafted Ulrich in the first round of the North American Soccer League draft, but did not sign Ulrich.  That year, the New York Arrows drafted Ulrich in the first round (12th overall) of the Major Indoor Soccer League college draft.  The Arrows signed Ulrich for $28,000 per year for two years.  He spent two seasons with the Arrows, until they folded at the end of the 1983-1984 season.  He then signed as a free agent with the Dallas Sidekicks on September 11, 1984.  He appeared in only sixteen games with the Sidekicks during the 1984-1985 season before the team released him on March 7, 1985.

Post playing career
After retiring from playing professionally, Ulrich was hired by IBM.

References

External links
 Sidekicks bio
 MISL stats

1961 births
Living people
All-American men's college soccer players
American soccer players
Association football defenders
Duke Blue Devils men's soccer players
Major Indoor Soccer League (1978–1992) players
New York Arrows players
Dallas Sidekicks (original MISL) players
Sportspeople from Poughkeepsie, New York
Tampa Bay Rowdies draft picks
Soccer players from New York (state)
Hermann Trophy men's winners